
Głogów County is a unit of territorial administration and local government (powiat) in Lower Silesian Voivodeship, south-western Poland. It came into being on January 1, 1999, as a result of the Polish local government reforms passed in 1998. Its administrative seat and only town is Głogów.

As of 2019 the total population of the county is 89,319, of which the population of the town of Głogów is 67,317 and the rural population is 22,002.

Neighbouring counties
Głogów County is bordered by Wschowa County to the north-east, Góra County to the east, Lubin County and Polkowice County to the south, and Żagań County and Nowa Sól County to the west.

Administrative division
The county is subdivided into six gminas (one urban and five rural). These are listed in the following table, in descending order of population.

References

 
Land counties of Lower Silesian Voivodeship